RAAF Base Amberley  is a Royal Australian Air Force (RAAF) military airbase located  southwest of Ipswich, Queensland in Australia and  southwest of Brisbane CBD. It is currently home to No. 1 Squadron (operating the F/A-18F Super Hornet), No. 6 Squadron (operating the EA-18G Growler), No. 33 Squadron (operating the Airbus KC-30A), No. 35 Squadron (operating the C-27J Spartan) and No. 36 Squadron (operating the Boeing C-17 Globemaster III). Amberley is also home to Army units making up the 9th Force Support Battalion (9 FSB). There are a variety of other formations on the base such as training colleges and maintenance areas. Amberley's largest squadron in terms of personnel is No. 382 Expeditionary Combat Support Squadron RAAF (ECSS) providing both garrison and deployed combat support. Amberley was one of only two airfields in Australia (the other being Darwin International Airport) that were listed as a Transoceanic Abort (TOA) landing site for the Space Shuttle. Amberley is currently undergoing a A$64 million dollar re-development program. The RAAF has plans to have Amberley operating as its "superbase" with flights of F/A-18F Super Hornets, KC-30A, C-17 Globemaster and the C-27J Spartan.

History
The need for a RAAF base in Brisbane was identified in the 1930s.  of land ca 8km south-west of the city of Ipswich was gazetted for defence purposes on 12 December 1938. 

This land was called Jeebropilly by the original land-owners of the Jagera, the Yuggera and Ugarapul clans. The name Jeebropilly denotes the flood plain that the region is.

The base was initially planned to house a general purpose squadron with 300 officers and men. At the outbreak of World War II the handful of brick buildings were still incomplete and many extra buildings were constructed quickly using wood and fibro. The base opened in June 1940 with the first unit based there being No. 24 Squadron. From May 1942 the base changed roles from flying operations to mainly assembly and repair of aircraft. 

The base was a major United States Army Air Forces base during 1942 and 1943. Known Fifth Air Force units assigned to "Amberley Field" were:

The US facilities were transferred to Australia in 1947. After the war it became the base for the RAAF's heavy bombers operated by No. 1, No. 2 and No. 6 squadrons. The reserve No. 23 (City of Brisbane) Squadron relocated from RAAF Station Archerfield to Amberley in 1955.

In 1965, the US extended a "Joint Research Program for Measuring the Physical Effects of Disturbances in the Atmosphere or in Space with particular emphasis on their effect on Radio Communications" from RAAF Base Pearce to the base at Amberley.

Current layout
The current layout of the aerodrome consists of two runways, 3km and 1.5km long.

Current units
The following units are based at RAAF Base Amberley:

See also
 United States Army Air Forces in Australia (World War II)
 List of airports in Queensland
List of Royal Australian Air Force installations

References

Further reading
 Maurer, Maurer (1983). Air Force Combat Units of World War II. Maxwell AFB, Alabama: Office of Air Force History. .

External links

Royal Australian Air Force bases
Airfields of the United States Army Air Forces in Australia
Airports in Queensland
Military buildings and structures in Queensland
Ipswich, Queensland
Queensland in World War II
Amberley
Amberley
Amberley, Queensland
Military installations in Queensland
Space Shuttle Emergency Landing Sites